Off the Peg is an Australian television series that aired in 1965. Starring Colin Croft, it was a variety series on ABC. It was announced as having "little, if any, talking" and as being "all songs, music and dancing". It aired during July and August. In Sydney the episode telecast 16 July 1965 aired at 9:30PM, and aired against Double Your Dollars on TCN-9, a film on ATN-7 and a film on TEN-10.

The archival status of the series is not known.

References

External links
Off the Peg on IMDb

1965 Australian television series debuts
1965 Australian television series endings
Australian Broadcasting Corporation original programming
English-language television shows
Black-and-white Australian television shows
Australian variety television shows